List of rivers flowing in the province of East Kalimantan, Indonesia:

In alphabetical order

See also 
 List of rivers of Indonesia
 List of rivers of Kalimantan

References 

 
East Kalimantan